Hristijan Dragarski (born 16 April 1992) is a Macedonian football defender who currently plays for Pelister.

Club career
After playing 5 seasons with FK Pelister, Dragarski moved abroad in summer 2014 and signed with Romanian Liga I side CS Concordia Chiajna.  After one season with Concordia, Dragarski signed in summer 2015 with Serbian side FK Radnik Surdulica which had just been promoted for the first time in their history to the Serbian SuperLiga.  However, before even making a league debut, Dragarski left Radnik.

Dragarski joined FC Struga in January 2019.

In June 2021, Dragarski signed with Albanian Champions Teuta Durrës on a one-year contract.

International career
He represented Macedonia at U19 and U21 levels.

Honours
Pelister
Macedonian Second League: 2011–12

References

External links
 

1992 births
Living people
Sportspeople from Bitola
Association football defenders
Macedonian footballers
North Macedonia youth international footballers
North Macedonia under-21 international footballers
FK Pelister players
CS Concordia Chiajna players
FK Radnik Surdulica players
FK Pobeda players
FC Struga players
Liga I players
Macedonian First Football League players
Macedonian Second Football League players
Macedonian expatriate footballers
Expatriate footballers in Romania
Macedonian expatriate sportspeople in Romania
Expatriate footballers in Serbia
Macedonian expatriate sportspeople in Serbia